Touched by Love (also called To Elvis, with Love) is a 1980 American drama film directed by Gus Trikonis and starring Diane Lane and Deborah Raffin. The screenplay concerns a therapist who tries a novel approach with a girl afflicted with cerebral palsy; she has her charge become a pen pal with the girl's favorite singer, Elvis Presley. The film was based on the real-life reminiscences of Lena Canada.

Raffin was nominated for both a Golden Globe Award for Best Actress — Motion Picture Drama and a Razzie for Worst Actress for her performance. The film received a second Razzie nomination for Hesper Anderson's screenplay.

Cast
Diane Lane as Karen Brown
Deborah Raffin as Lena Canada
Michael Learned as Dr. Bell
John Amos as Tony
Cristina Raines as Amy
Mary Wickes as Margaret
Clu Gulager as Don Fielder

References

External links 
 
 
 

1980 films
1980 drama films
American drama films
Canadian drama films
Columbia Pictures films
English-language Canadian films
1980s English-language films
Films scored by John Barry (composer)
Films about people with cerebral palsy
Films based on non-fiction books
Films shot in Alberta
Films directed by Gus Trikonis
1980s American films
1980s Canadian films